Gregory W. Cappelli (born c. 1968) is an American business executive who specializes in national education policy. He is the CEO of Apollo Education Group, a Fortune 1000 company and the parent company of the University of Phoenix, as well as chairman of Apollo Global, a subsidiary company that invests money in educational institutions.

Apollo Education Group

Cappelli began working at Apollo Education Group (“Apollo”) in 2007, serving as executive vice president of global strategy and assistant to the executive chairman. He was appointed co-CEO of Apollo on April 27, 2009, at the age of 41. As co-CEO, he shared the role with Chas Edelstein. The two men had worked together at Credit Suisse before each joined Apollo Group. Three years later, he became the sole CEO of the Apollo.

In 2012, Mother Jones named him one of the ten most overpaid CEOs.

Workforce

During Cappelli's work as CEO, Apollo partnered with Fortune 1000 companies to train company employees. In 2015, Apollo created a business unit called Apollo Professional Development. The unit runs programs that train employees at Fortune 1000 companies. Chief Executive Magazine called him “passionate about creating a skilled workforce for employees.”

Boards, media appearances and recognition

Cappelli is a member of:
 Former board of directors members of Everybody Wins!, located in New York
 The Board of Governors of the Boys and Girls Club of America
 The board of trustees of his graduate school alma mater, Dominican University

A few days after the 2012 presidential election, he was on a live C-SPAN television special called “Voter Demographics and 2012 Elections.” He served as a panelist offering his insight and answering questions from the audience.

While he was an analyst at Credit Suisse, in the 2003 “Beat on the Street” analyst survey, he earned “top honors.”

Education

He graduated with a B.A. in economics from Indiana University. He later earned an MBA at Dominican University.

References

External links
 Executive profile at Apollo Group
 Greg Cappelli on "What it Takes", Education Nation. (Video). NBC, 2014.

1960s births
Living people
21st-century American businesspeople
Indiana University Bloomington alumni
Dominican University (Illinois) alumni